Gordon Smith is an American television screenwriter, best known for his work on Breaking Bad and Better Call Saul. Smith has been nominated for three individual Primetime Emmys, and won the Writers Guild of America Award for Television: Episodic Drama in 2018 for the episode "Chicanery", and has received several other nominations.

Career
Smith started as an office production assistant for season 3 of Breaking Bad, then became Vince Gilligan's assistant in season 4, and the writers' assistant in season 5. Smith co-wrote the Breaking Bad mini-featurette titled Chicks 'N' Guns which was released on the fifth season Blu-ray.

Smith was then hired as a staff writer for the Breaking Bad spinoff Better Call Saul. His first television script, for the episode "Five-O" (from season 1) earned him a Primetime Emmy Award nomination for Outstanding Writing for a Drama Series. He also wrote episode 8 from the first season, titled "RICO". For the second season of Better Call Saul, Smith was promoted to story editor and wrote two episodes, "Gloves Off" and "Inflatable". In the third season, he was promoted to a producer, and wrote another two episodes, "Chicanery" and "Fall". The episode "Chicanery" earned Smith his second Primetime Emmy Award nomination for Outstanding Writing for a Drama Series.

In April 2017, Smith signed with Sony Pictures Television, where he served as a consulting producer for the WGN America television series Outsiders and was confirmed to return to Better Call Saul for its fourth season. For season 4, Smith was promoted to supervising producer and wrote two episodes, "Something Beautiful" and "Coushatta". For the fifth season, Smith was promoted co-executive producer and wrote two episodes, "Namaste" and "Bagman". Smith also made his directorial debut with the episode "Namaste". For the sixth and final season, Smith continued as a co-executive producer and wrote the third ("Rock and Hard Place") and eighth ("Point and Shoot") episodes while also directing the former episode.

Accolades

References

External links

Living people
American screenwriters
Year of birth missing (living people)